Charles Schuldiner (born May 13, 1967 – December 13, 2001) was an American musician. He founded the death metal band Death in 1983, in which he was the lead vocalist, guitarist, primary songwriter and only continuous member until his death in 2001. His obituary in the January 5, 2002 issue of UK's Kerrang! magazine described him as "one of the most significant figures in the history of metal."  Schuldiner was ranked No. 10 in Joel McIver's book The 100 Greatest Metal Guitarists in 2009 and No. 20 in March 2004 Guitar Worlds "The 100 Greatest Metal Guitarists". In 1987, Schuldiner founded the publishing company Mutilation Music, affiliated with performance rights organization BMI. Schuldiner died in 2001 of a brain tumor.

Schuldiner is often referred to as "The Godfather of death metal", although he was uncomfortable with this nickname, remarking that "I don't think I should take the credits for this death metal stuff. I'm just a guy from a band, and I think Death is a metal band."

Biography

Early life
Schuldiner was born on May 13, 1967, on Long Island, New York. His father Mal Schuldiner was Jewish and the son of Austrian immigrants, and his mother Jane Schuldiner was from the American South and had converted to Judaism.  In 1968, his family moved to Florida. 
He started playing guitar at the age of 9.

Schuldiner was originally inspired by Black Sabbath, Judas Priest, Iron Maiden, Kiss and classical jazz, among others. He was particularly interested in the metal movement known as NWOBHM – New Wave of British Heavy Metal – and cited bands of that genre among his favorites. He frequently cited French band Sortilège as his personal favorite metal group. Slayer, Celtic Frost, Possessed, Mercyful Fate/King Diamond and Metallica were later influences he would apply more to his own songwriting. Later in his career, Schuldiner frequently cited progressive metal bands such as Watchtower, Coroner and Queensrÿche as influences. The official Schuldiner website, Empty Words, quotes Schuldiner's mother making the claim that he enjoyed all forms of music except country and rap.

Schuldiner performed well in school before becoming bored with education and eventually dropping out. He later regretted this decision. He has stated that if he had not become a musician, he would have liked to have become a veterinarian or a cook.

Musical career
Taking inspiration from Nasty Savage, Schuldiner formed Death as Mantas in 1983 when he was just 16 years old. Original members were Schuldiner (guitar), Rick Rozz (guitar) and Kam Lee (drums and vocals). In January 1986, Schuldiner moved to Toronto and temporarily joined the Canadian band Slaughter. However, he quickly returned to continue the formation of Death.

Death underwent many lineup changes. With Chris Reifert, Schuldiner eventually released the first Death album, titled Scream Bloody Gore, in 1987. He continued with 1988's Leprosy with the line-up of former Mantas guitarist Rick Rozz and rhythm section Terry Butler on bass and Bill Andrews on drums, and 1990's Spiritual Healing, where guitarist James Murphy had replaced the fired Rozz in 1989.

After Spiritual Healing, Schuldiner stopped working with full-time band members, preferring to work with studio and live venue musicians, due to bad relationships with Death's previous rhythm section and guitarists. This earned Schuldiner something of a 'perfectionist' reputation in the metal community. Schuldiner had also fired his manager Eric Greif but settled and re-hired him before the recording of his next, influential release.

Death's breakthrough album, Human saw the band evolving to a more technical and progressive style, in which Schuldiner displayed his guitar skills more than ever. He continued in this style (and continued the success of the band) with 1993's Individual Thought Patterns, 1995's Symbolic, and finally The Sound of Perseverance in 1998.

He put Death on hold after this to continue Control Denied, which he had been putting together prior to the release of The Sound of Perseverance, and released The Fragile Art of Existence in 1999. Control Denied also had other players from the latest Death album but featured a melodic metal vocalist. Schuldiner also played guitar in the "supergroup" Voodoocult on the album Jesus Killing Machine in 1994 and played a guest solo on Naphobia's 1995 release, Of Hell on the track "As Ancients Evolve" as a favor to the band's bassist at the time who was a friend of Schuldiner's. Schuldiner was also asked to be one of the many guest vocalists on Dave Grohl's 2001 Probot. Grohl, Napalm Death, Ozzy Osbourne, and Anthrax all increased efforts to raise funds for Schuldiner's medical bills with Grohl trying to involve Schuldiner on an album he was working on. In a 1999 interview, Schuldiner spoke about why he didn't sing on the Control Denied album The Fragile Art of Existence "...these vocals are all I ever wanted to do in Death but couldn't. I've had this dream of recording like that for years, and it seems like a dream come true. Tim Aymar is an amazing singer and this is the main difference. I think people will be surprised at the violence and strength of the album. Many people are expecting something like Iron Maiden, but, despite being one of my favorite bands, I didn't want to make an Iron Maiden-like album. I wanted to make an unpredictable album, just like I did in Death, I guess. I don't like to make predictable albums."

Illness and death

In 1999, Schuldiner was diagnosed with brain cancer.  He continued to work on his music, continuing his work with Control Denied. He was at first unable to afford the surgery that he needed immediately. A press release called for support from everyone, including fellow artists. Jane Schuldiner urged all who read the statements about Schuldiner and his illness to go out and get insurance, stating her frustration in the American healthcare system. Schuldiner had taken out medical insurance after his first surgery, but the insurer had refused to pay because the cancer pre-dated insurance being taken out.  Many artists, including Kid Rock, Korn and Red Hot Chili Peppers, got together during the summer of 2001 to auction off personal items, with the funds assisting Schuldiner's medical expenses, an effort covered by MTV. Matt Heafy, vocalist and guitarist for Trivium, has also stated that at the age of 15 his band had played a benefit show for Schuldiner while he was in the hospital in their days as a local band. In November 2001, Schuldiner's condition worsened as he became ill with Pneumocystis carinii.

On December 13, 2001, Schuldiner died at the age of 34 and was cremated.

Legacy
With the assistance of Schuldiner's family, former manager Eric Greif handled his legacy as President of Perseverance Holdings Ltd. Schuldiner's mother Jane and sister Beth Schuldiner frequently interact with his fans and both have stated many times that they enjoy his music. Greif kept track of his recordings and handled Schuldiner's intellectual property. Beth Schuldiner has a son named Christopher Steele, who also plays guitar and has all of Schuldiner's guitars. BC Rich also released a statement in their 2008 catalog stating that Schuldiner's signature model Stealth will be available for purchase, and that endorsement is overseen by Steele.

A legal battle began from the time of Schuldiner's death on the settlement of the rights to the partially completed second Control Denied album, When Man and Machine Collide, which was recorded in 2000–2001 and was scheduled for release in 2013. Demos of these unreleased Control Denied songs, as well as early Death demos and live Death recordings from 1990, were released in the Zero Tolerance two-part compilation bootlegs by the Dutch Hammerheart Holdings company and the Schuldiners and Greif asserted rights on behalf of Schuldiner's Estate. The matter was settled in November 2009, anticipating the project being finished and released in 2010.

Tribute concerts have been coordinated or funded by Schuldiner's mother and family and various Death tribute groups internationally. Former CKY frontman, Deron Miller, who considers Schuldiner an idol of his, got the idea, while working on various projects with former Death guitarist (and pituitary tumor survivor) James Murphy, to do a tribute album.  Murphy announced he would release a Chuck Schuldiner tribute album to commemorate his lasting mark on the metal community and Schuldiner's family publicly offered support for Murphy's effort, though it has never materialized. Schuldiner's sister Beth confirmed via her YouTube channel that Death: Live in Japan, a behind the scenes Death video, as well as a potential boxset containing all of Schuldiner's works including some exclusive copies of handwritten notes by Schuldiner are in the works via Relapse Records. Schuldiner Estate lawyer Eric Greif held a charity Chuck Schuldiner Birthday Bash in Calgary, Alberta, May 13, 2011, featuring speeches by Greif and former Death guitarist Paul Masvidal, as well as bands performing Schuldiner's music.

Book
In January 2001, Mahyar Dean, an Iranian metal guitarist/musician, wrote Death, a book about Death and Schuldiner poems. The book includes bilingual lyrics and many articles about the band. The book was sent through the site keepers of emptywords.org to Schuldiner, who in his words was "truly blown away and honored by the obvious work and devotion he put into bringing the book to life".

Beliefs
Schuldiner designed the Death logo and its various incarnations during the length of his career. In 1991, before the release of Human, he cleaned up the logo taking out more intricate details and the "T" in the logo was swapped from an inverted cross to a more regular looking "T", one reason being to quash any implication of religion.

Schuldiner was also openly against hard drugs; he is quoted as saying, "I've tripped several times. That's all because I don't like the hard drugs. And my only drugs are alcohol and grass."

Musical style
Schuldiner was mostly self-taught as a guitarist. In 1993, he expressed a disinterest in music theory: "I know enough about what I'm playing to memorize the scales and things, but I have no idea how you would label them. As long as I can play it, memorize it and apply it, I don't need to know what you call it."

In the early days of Death, Schuldiner used a "deep, raspy" death growl vocal technique. He said in 1993 that "it takes a lot of energy and a lot of throat abuse to get through a show."

Equipment 
Schuldiner used a simple setup. For most of his career, his main guitar was a B.C. Rich Stealth fitted with a single DiMarzio X2N bridge pickup. For his amplification, Schuldiner used a Marshall Valvestate 8100 head played through a Marshall Valvestate VS412 cabinet. He used 10-46 gauge GHS Boomers strings, and a Dunlop Tortex .88mm pick. Schuldiner used very little effects except for a chorus effect during his solos.

Discography

with Death 

Scream Bloody Gore (1987)
Leprosy (1988)
Spiritual Healing (1990)
Human (1991)
Individual Thought Patterns (1993)
Symbolic (1995)
The Sound of Perseverance (1998)

with Voodoocult 
 Jesus Killing Machine (1994)

with Control Denied 
 The Fragile Art of Existence (1999)

See also
Honorific nicknames in popular music
Death discography
Extreme metal genres

References

General sources
The Metal Crusade, official site of The Death Fan Club
Empty Words, official Death/Control Denied archival site

External links

 

1967 births
2001 deaths
Deaths from pneumonia in Florida
American heavy metal guitarists
American heavy metal singers
American people of Austrian-Jewish descent
Rhythm guitarists
Lead guitarists
Death (metal band) members
Death metal musicians
Deaths from brain cancer in the United States
Jewish American musicians
Jewish singers
Jewish American songwriters
Singers from New York (state)
People from Glen Cove, New York
Singers from Orlando, Florida
People from Altamonte Springs, Florida
Progressive metal guitarists
Songwriters from Florida
Songwriters from New York (state)
20th-century American singers
Jewish heavy metal musicians
20th-century American guitarists
Guitarists from Florida
Guitarists from New York (state)
American male guitarists
Control Denied members
Voodoocult members
20th-century American male singers
20th-century American Jews
American male songwriters